The 1982 United States Senate election in Nebraska was held on November 5, 1982 to select the U.S. Senator from the state of Nebraska. Democratic U.S. Senator Edward Zorinsky won re-election.

Candidates

Democratic 
 Edward Zorinsky, incumbent U.S. Senator

Republican 
 Jim Keck, Air Force officer

Results

See also 
 1982 United States Senate elections

References 

1982 Nebraska elections
Nebraska
1982